Kutztown Golden Bears men's basketball is a Division II basketball program who represents Kutztown University of Pennsylvania. They play all of their home games at Keystone Hall on campus. The basketball team was established in 1903. It is currently under the direction of head coach Bernie Driscoll, who has led the program since 2000. The team won the PSAC East regular-season title in 1988 and shared the division title in 2008.  Since 2003, the team has posted five straight winning seasons, and has an appearance in the PSAC title game (2004).

Current roster

References